The following is a flag list of Laos.

National

Present

Historical flags

Royal standards

Military flags

Subjects 

 Kingdoms

 Flags of ethnic minorities and minority organisations

Organizations
 Lao Front for National Construction

 Lao People's Revolutionary Party

 Lao Neutralist Movement

Under foreign domination 

 Khmer Empire

 Burmese Empire 

 Chinese (2 AD - 1885)

 Siamese (1707 - 1893)

 Vietnamese (334 BC - 1848) 

 Indochinese (1893 - 1953)

See also

 Emblems of Laos
 Anthems of Laos

References

 Flag of Laos - A brief history

National symbols of Laos
L
Flags